The Florida Distance Learning Consortium FDLC is a network of all public (39) and private (27) post secondary institutions in Florida serving a total of 1.3 million students annually. These institutions range in size from fewer than 2000 to over 100,000 students. The FDLC is funded by the Florida legislature and supports its member institutions in their delivery of e-Learning through support for student and web services, faculty development, statewide licensing, and sharing resources, including a learning object  repository-- The Orange Grove—and an online catalog of over 10,000 distance learning courses offered by membership institutions throughout Florida.

The FDLC facilitates cross-institutional communication and spearheads statewide initiatives in Distance Learning.  Recognizing the autonomy of Florida’s educational institutions, the Consortium relies on the voluntary participation of its members to coordinate its activities..  There is no charge for membership.

Initiatives and Projects

The Orange Grove

Ed-Pass

Girls Get Information Technology (Girls Get I.T.) is operated by the Florida Endowment Foundation for Florida's Graduates.

Member Institutions

Community Colleges
 Brevard Community College
 Broward Community College
 Central Florida Community College
 Chipola College
 Daytona Beach Community College
 Edison Community College
 Florida Community College at Jacksonville
 Florida Keys Community College
 Gulf Coast Community College
 Hillsborough Community College
 Indian River Community College
 Lake City Community College
 Lake-Sumter State College
 Manatee Community College
 Miami-Dade College
 North Florida Community College
 Okaloosa-Walton College
 Palm Beach Community College
 Pasco–Hernando State College
 Pensacola Junior College
 Polk Community College
 St. Johns River Community College
 St. Petersburg College
 Santa Fe Community College
 Seminole Community College
 South Florida Community College
 Tallahassee Community College
 Valencia Community College

Independent Colleges and Universities of Florida (ICUF)
 Barry University
 Bethune-Cookman College
 Clearwater Christian College
 Eckerd College
 Edward Waters College
 Embry-Riddle Aeronautical University
 Flagler College
 Florida College
 Florida Hospital College of Health Sciences
 Florida Institute of Technology
 Florida Memorial College
 Florida Southern College
 Florida Space Research Institute
 Hodges University
 Jacksonville University
 Lynn University
 Nova Southeastern University
 Palm Beach Atlantic University
 Rollins College
 Saint Leo University
 Southeastern University
 St. Thomas University
 Stetson University
 University of Miami
 University of Tampa
 Warner Southern College
 Webber International University

State Universities
 Florida Agricultural & Mechanical University
 Florida Atlantic University
 Florida Gulf Coast University
 Florida International University
 Florida State University
 New College of Florida
 University of Central Florida
 University of Florida
 University of North Florida
 University of South Florida
 University of West Florida

Staff
Dr. John Opper
Executive Director

Susie Henderson
Associate Executive Director

Education in Florida